Mimagyrta pampa is a moth of the subfamily Arctiinae. It was described by Herbert Druce in 1893. It is found in Ecuador.

References

 

Arctiinae
Moths described in 1893